Louder Than Ever is the fourteenth studio album by Danish hard rock/heavy metal Pretty Maids. It was released on 21 March 2014 by Frontiers Records. The album consists of re-recordings of eight previously released songs from the period 1994 to 2006, taken from the studio albums Scream (1994), Anything Worth Doing Is Worth Overdoing (1999), Carpe Diem (2000), Planet Panic (2002), and Wake Up to the Real World (2006). It also features the four new songs, "Deranged", "My Soul to Take", "Nuclear Boomerang", and "A Heart Without a Home" which was recorded especially for the album. An official music video for "Nuclear Boomerang" was released on 10 February 2014.

According to lead singer Ronnie Atkins, Louder Than Ever serves as an "in between album" to tie in with the band's upcoming fifteenth studio album. Atkins has said the band "were curious to hear how some of the older songs would sound like with the band lineup we have today and in the hands of our current producer, Jacob Hansen." The band deliberately chose not to re-record songs from albums such as Future World (1987) and Jump the Gun (1990) as they are "sacred, both to ourselves as well as the fans".

Track listing

The album was also released as a CD/DVD edition with the bonus DVD titled Why So Serious - A Retrospective of the "Motherland" 2013 World Tour.

Charts

References

2014 albums
Pretty Maids albums
Frontiers Records albums
Albums produced by Jacob Hansen